Pete Sampras was the defending champion, but lost in the third round to Magnus Larsson.

Jonas Björkman won the title, defeating Carlos Moyá in the final 6–3, 7–6(7–3).

Seeds
The top eight seeds received a bye into the second round.

Draw

Finals

Top half

Section 1

Section 2

Bottom half

Section 3

Section 4

References

External links
Main Draw

1997 ATP Tour